Salvia amethystina is a large aromatic undershrub that is endemic to Colombia. It is found in cloud forests and in bushy ground, often in riparian areas by streams, at  elevation.

Salvia amethystina is divided into two subspecies: S. amethystina subsp. amethystina and S. amethystina subsp. ampelophylla, differentiated by the number and size of the flowers.

References

amethystina
Endemic flora of Colombia